Carol Chu Lai-chien (born Chu Lai-hing; 6 April 1966) is a Malaysian entertainer and former model. She is the wife of Hong Kong actor and singer Andy Lau, whom she married in 2008.

Background
She was born Chu Lai-hing in Penang, Malaysia. Her family were Hoklo people descended from the Zhao'an County, Zhangzhou, Fujian Province of China. While she was still young, her family moved to Kuala Lumpur.

Chu first started out as a model, and later in 1985, she contested in the Malaysian New Tide beauty pageant and emerged as a third runner-up in the contest. On the following year in 1986, she was introduced to Hong Kong actor and singer Andy Lau, supposedly by the Hong Kong singer Sally Yeh. However, sources often indicated that it was Lau's manager Cheung Kwok-chung, who happens to be a relative of Chu.

From 1991 onwards, Lau's secret relationship with her was often subjected to media attentions and speculations. Chu became a vegetarian in 2004. Lau and Chu were discreetly married at Las Vegas, Nevada, on 23 June 2008.

Their daughter, Hanna Lau, was born at the Hong Kong Sanatorium & Hospital in Hong Kong on 9 May 2012. In 2013, Lau, being devoted to Chu, became a vegetarian as well. Their three-year-old daughter was first revealed by the Next Magazine on 8 April 2015 while they were at the Chaoyang Park in Beijing.

References

1966 births
Living people
People from Penang
Malaysian people of Hokkien descent
Malaysian people of Chinese descent
Malaysian female models
Malaysian Buddhists